Staphylinochrous euryperalis is a species of moth of the family Anomoeotidae.
It is found in Cameroon, the Central African Republic, Uganda and Zimbabwe.

References

External links
Original description: 

Anomoeotidae
Insects of Cameroon
Insects of Uganda
Moths of Africa
Moths described in 1910